In Old Mexico is a 1938 American Western film directed by Edward D. Venturini and written by Harrison Jacobs. The film stars William Boyd, George "Gabby" Hayes, Russell Hayden, Paul Sutton, Al Ernest Garcia, Jan Clayton and Trevor Bardette. The film was released on September 9, 1938, by Paramount Pictures.

Plot
Hoppy (William Boyd) and his pals must journey to Mexico after receiving a summons. Upon arrival, they realize that it was fake and that a good friend has been mysteriously murdered. They solve the puzzle with the assistance of the killer's feisty sister and a band of helpful caballeros.

Cast
 William Boyd as Hopalong Cassidy
 George "Gabby" Hayes as Windy Halliday 
 Russell Hayden as Lucky Jenkins
 Paul Sutton as The Fox
 Al Ernest Garcia as Don Carlos Gonzales 
 Jan Clayton as Anita Gonzales 
 Trevor Bardette as Rurales Colonel Gonzales
 Betty Amann as Janet Leeds
 Anna Demetrio as Elena
 Glenn Strange as Henchman Burke
 Tony Roux as Pancho

References

External links 
 
 
 
 

1938 films
American Western (genre) films
1938 Western (genre) films
Paramount Pictures films
Hopalong Cassidy films
American black-and-white films
1930s English-language films
1930s American films